Drosophila robusta is a fly species in the genus Drosophila, first described by Alfred Sturtevant in 1916.

References 

r
Insects described in 1916